Reshard Nelson Langford (born February 6, 1986) is a former American football safety who played for three seasons in the National Football League (NFL). After playing college football for Vanderbilt, he signed with the Philadelphia Eagles as an undrafted free agent in 2009. He played for the Kansas City Chiefs from 2009–2011, and was also a member of the Detroit Lions and Saskatchewan Roughriders.

Early years
Langford was born to Ricky and Delphine Langford and attended Tanner High School in Tanner, Alabama. Langford lettered in football, basketball, baseball and track and field. In football, he was a three-year starter at running back and safety. After his senior season, he was named a 2A First-team All-State defensive back and All-Region. He rushed for 1,459 yards as a senior, averaging 9.7 yards per carry and 30 touchdowns. On defense, Langford intercepted 3 passes and made 59 tackles. As a junior, he rushed for 1,351 yards and 15 touchdowns. He returned a punt and an interception for touchdowns during his junior season. In basketball, he was a two-time All-Region pick as a forward and center. In track, he placed in four events as a junior.

College career
Langford played college football at Vanderbilt from 2004–2008. He started all four years for the Commodores as a safety. He made 247 career tackles and eleven interceptions. During his senior season, he was named team captain, and twice earned the team's most valuable defensive back award. He was named to the All-SEC freshman team in 2005.

Professional career
After his senior season at Vanderbilt University he was rated as the 13th best safety available in the 2009 NFL Draft by Gil Brandt.

Philadelphia Eagles
Langford signed with the Philadelphia Eagles after being undrafted in the 2009 NFL Draft on April 27, 2009. He was waived on September 5, 2009 and signed to the team's practice squad on September 7.

Kansas City Chiefs
Langford was signed off the Eagles' practice squad by the Kansas City Chiefs on December 25, 2009 and added to the 53-man active roster but did not appear in any games. He appeared in 6 games the following season and then in 11 games during the 2011 season, 2 of which he was a starter at the strong safety position.

Detroit Lions
Langford spent the 2012 NFL season as a member of the Detroit Lions. He did not appear in any games after suffering a calf injury in the preseason and was subsequently waived after the team reached an injury settlement.

Saskatchewan Roughriders
On May 17, 2013, Langford signed with the Saskatchewan Roughriders of the Canadian Football League. He was released during final roster cuts on June 22, 2013.

Personal life
Langford has a younger brother, Marquis. Langford's first job was at Green Briar, a barbecue restaurant, where he was a busboy. He grew up as a fan of the Denver Broncos and Chicago Bulls. Langford majored in sociology at Vanderbilt University.

References

External links
Kansas City Chiefs bio
Philadelphia Eagles bio
Vanderbilt Commodores Football bio

1986 births
Living people
People from Limestone County, Alabama
Players of American football from Alabama
American football safeties
Vanderbilt Commodores football players
Philadelphia Eagles players
Kansas City Chiefs players
Detroit Lions players
Saskatchewan Roughriders players